PBK is a full-service architectural planning and design firm headquartered in Houston, Texas. The firm provides clients with services related to architecture, engineering, interior design, planning, technology, and facilities consulting. The firm also specializes in sports, healthcare, corporate, and municipal facilities.

PBK Sports, a PBK company, launched in 2002 to focus primarily on the development of athletic venues.

History 
PBK was founded in 1981 by Dan Boggio, AIA, LEEP AP BD+C, Executive Chairman. It now has over 550 employees and seventeen regional offices.

Notable PBK Buildings
 Meridian Centre
 Atascocita High School
 Richard E. Berry Educational Support Center
 John Paul Stevens High School
 Katy Performing Arts Center
 Clear Creek ISD Educational Village
 McKinney Boyd High School
 Leonard E. Merrell Center
 Tompkins High School
 Eagle Stadium
Toyota Center (Kennewick)

References
 PBK.com
 Houston Business Journal
 McGraw-Hill Construction
 McGraw-Hill Construction
 CFISD.net
 CEFPI
 

Architecture firms based in Texas